Almost an Actress was a 1913 American silent short comedy film directed by Allen Curtis and starring Louise Fazenda, Max Asher, Lon Chaney and Silvion de Jardins. A surviving still from the film shows Lon Chaney as the exasperated cameraman, grimacing in frustration as chaos envelops the film set. The film is now considered lost. It is unknown when the film was lost, but if it was in Universal's vaults it would have been deliberately destroyed along with the remaining copies of Universal's silent era films in 1948.

Comedian Silvion de Jardins, who later changed his name to Bobby Vernon, also worked for the Kolb and Dill burlesque and stage company which had also once starred Lon Chaney in its productions.

Plot
Susie (Louise Fazenda) turns down Lee's (Lee Morris) offer of love, planning instead to become a famous actress.  The director of a film team engages Susie to star in an exciting serial after his leading lady's false teeth break, but chaos ensues. Susie's brother Benny sees her being menaced by a villain who is preparing to burn her alive, not realizing they are just making a movie. He gets the fire department involved, and they create a deluge on the set with their hoses. The director finally manages to chase the firemen away.

Later, while filming a scene on a beach, Susie is almost drowned accidentally when the film crew leaves her tied up in a rising tide.  Her boyfriend rescues her just in time, and Susie decides to marry him and give up acting forever. Realizing how dangerous filmmaking can be, she exclaims "Never again!" as she falls into her beau's arms.

Cast
 Louise Fazenda as Susie
 Max Asher as The Director
 Edward Holland as The Villain
 Lee Morris as Lee
 Lon Chaney as a cameraman
 Silvion de Jardins as Benny (Susie's brother)
 Lee Moran

Reception
Motion Picture World commented "A very laughable production of the low comedy type, full of chuckles and free from offense....The scenes are all of burlesque nature and furnish plenty of genuine amusement."

References

External links
 

1913 films
1913 comedy films
1913 short films
1913 lost films
Silent American comedy films
American silent short films
American black-and-white films
Films about actors
Films directed by Allen Curtis
Lost American films
Universal Pictures short films
American comedy short films
Lost comedy films
1910s American films